Cornelius Høyer (26 February 1771 – 2 June 1804) was a Danish painter, mainly known for his work in miniatures. Within his special trade, he was among the virtuosos of his day and won an international reputation.

Early life and education
Høyer was born at the Kronborg Rifle Factory. From an early age he attended the Royal Danish Academy of Fine Arts, studying under Carl Gustaf Pilo and Louis Tocqué, and later continued his education in Paris where Jean-Baptiste Masse taught him miniature painting.

A visit to Italy in 1767 introduced him to Rosalba Carriera and he learned new skills, including the special technique of painting on ivory.

Career
In 1769, Høyer was appointed Miniature Painter to the Danish Court and the following year he became a member of the Academy. Visits to several European courts, including those in Stockholm, Saint Petersburg and Berlin, contributed to his increasing international reputation.

Personal life
Høyer was married to Frederikke Christiane Fortling (17551829), daughter of the court stone mason Jacob Fortling  (1711–61) and Anne Christine Hellesen (c. 1724–72). They were wed on On 15 October 1773 in St. Peter's Church in Copenhagen.

Gallery

See also

 List of Danish painters

References

Portrait miniaturists
18th-century Danish painters
18th-century male artists
Danish male painters
1741 births
1804 deaths
Royal Danish Academy of Fine Arts alumni